The MTV Video Music Award for Best Rock was first given out in , one of the four original genre categories added to the VMAs that year. In its first year, the award was called Best Heavy Metal Video, and from 1990 to 1995, it was renamed Best Metal/Hard Rock Video. The category underwent a third, brief name change in 1996, when it was renamed Best Hard Rock Video. In 1997, the award acquired its most enduring name, Best Rock Video, which it retained until 2016. The following year, the word "Video" was removed from all genre categories at the VMAs (despite nominations still going to specific videos), giving this award its current name: Best Rock.

In 2008, though, MTV brought back this award, along with several of the others that had been retired in 2007.

Aerosmith is the most frequent winner of this award, with a total of four wins between 1990 and 1998. Closely following them are Aerosmith and Linkin Park, with eight nominations. In 1995, White Zombie's bassist Sean Yseult became the first woman to win this award, while in 2014, New Zealand singer Lorde became the first female solo act to win this male-dominated category.

Recipients

See also 
 MTV Europe Music Award for Best Rock

References 

MTV Video Music Awards
Rock music awards
Awards established in 1989